Surfside is a town in Miami-Dade County, Florida, United States. The population was 5,689 as of the 2020 census. Surfside is a primarily residential beachside community, with several multistory condominium buildings adjacent to Surfside Beach on the Atlantic Ocean. The town is bordered on the south by the North Beach neighborhood of Miami Beach, on the north by Bal Harbour, on the west by Biscayne Bay, and on the east by the Atlantic Ocean.

History

Between 1923 and 1925, the Tatum Brothers subdivided the land on what is now Surfside.

Starting in 1924, Henri Levy developed Biscaya Island and a portion of land from 87th to 92nd Streets.

In 1929–1930, Russell T. Pancoast, built the Surf Club 90th Street and Collins Avenue.

In 1935, fearing annexation by the city of Miami Beach, Florida, 35 members of the privately-owned club incorporated the Town of Surfside and financed the venture with a $28,500 loan.

Spearman Lewis was the first mayor of Surfside.

In 1956, Surfside purchased the Lehman Estate on the northeast corner of 93rd Street and Collins Avenue. It acquired additional land via eminent domain and then built a community center.

In 1960, Hawthorne Park was dedicated.

On March 1, 1973, Surfside signed a contract with Miami-Dade County to outsource fire/rescue services.

In 1983, The Shul of Bal Harbour was established at 9540 Collins Avenue.

Condominium building collapse

On June 24, 2021, at 1:22 a.m. EDT, Champlain Towers South, a 12-story condominium building at 8777 Collins Avenue, partially collapsed, causing 98 deaths, in one of the deadliest structural failures in United States history. The building's 40-year recertification was in progress and the roof was being repaired. The cause of the collapse of the structure has not been established.

Geography

Surrounding areas
  Bal Harbour
  Bay Harbor Islands    Atlantic Ocean
 Bay Harbor Islands, Indian Creek   Atlantic Ocean
  Miami Beach    Atlantic Ocean
  Miami Beach

Street names
Avenues in Surfside are named for British and American authors and run in alphabetical order from east to west.
In 1979, 95th Street in Surfside was renamed "Isaac Singer Boulevard" to reflect the residency of the famous Yiddish author Isaac Bashevis Singer on that street from 1977 until his death in 1991.

Demographics

2020 census

As of the 2020 United States census, there were 5,689 people, 2,328 households, and 1,519 families residing in the town.

2010 census

As of 2000, Spanish was spoken as a first language by 49.41% of residents, while English was spoken by 42.11% of the population. Other languages spoken included Portuguese 2.36%, Russian 2.04%, German and Yiddish were both tied at 1.40%, and French was the mother tongue for 1.29% of the populace.

Jewish population
Approximately one-third of the population of Surfside are Jews. It is also the most Jewish community in the Miami metropolitan area. Around 2,500 Jews reside in Surfside. Including neighboring areas, 34% of Jews describe themselves as Orthodox, 24% as Conservative, 18% as Reform and 24% as "just Jewish".

Education

Residents are assigned to Miami-Dade County Public Schools.

Ruth K. Broad/Bay Harbor K–8 Center in Bay Harbor Islands serves as the local elementary and K–8 school. Residents who want to have a conventional middle school may instead choose the zoned middle school, Miami Beach Nautilus Middle School. Miami Beach Senior High School is the senior high school serving Surfside.

Notable people
 Philip B. Hofmann, former CEO of Johnson & Johnson
 Jared Kushner, son-in-law of former U.S. President Donald Trump and Senior Advisor to the President between 2017 and 2021. 
 Sholom Lipskar, rabbi and founder of The Shul of Bal Harbour
 Rudolph W. Riefkohl, officer in United States Army
 Isaac Bashevis Singer, Yiddish writer, lived in Surfside from 1977 until his death in 1991
 Sid Tepper, songwriter, lived in Surfside from 1970 to 2004
 Ivanka Trump, daughter of former U.S. President Donald Trump and Senior Advisor to the President between 2017 and 2021

In popular culture
In 2018, Josh's Deli offerings of "Jewban" and "Spicy Tuna Latke" were featured in Food Paradise (season 17).

References

External links

 Town of Surfside Official government website
 Visit Surfside Official tourism website

1935 establishments in Florida
Beaches of Florida
Beaches of Miami-Dade County, Florida
Jews and Judaism in Miami-Dade County, Florida
Orthodox Judaism in Florida
Orthodox Jewish communities
Populated coastal places in Florida on the Atlantic Ocean
Populated places established in 1935
 
Towns in Florida
Towns in Miami-Dade County, Florida